The Battle of Leuze was a minor Cavalry engagement of the Nine Years' War that took place on 18 September 1691 between a detachment of French and a superior Allied force.

Marshal Luxembourg had been informed that William III of Orange had left for England, in the supposition that the campaign of 1691 was at its end. He was also informed that Marshal Waldeck, who was left in charge, was preparing to retire into winter quarters.

Luxembourg was near Tournai and sent out a reconnaissance under Marsilly, from whom he learned that the main body of the Allied army was retreating, leaving a rear-guard of cavalry, consisting of just 3,000 men, under the Count of Tilly at Leuze. Luxembourg acted immediately. He send a detachment to follow the movements of the main body, and with the squadrons of Villars and Marsilly he attacked the smaller party without warning. The French cavalry charged, only using their swords.

As soon as Field Marshal Nassau-Saarbrücken-Usingen became aware of the French attack, he turned around with the entire left wing and tried to turn the tide. This further increased Allied losses, because the squadrons which rushed to the rescue did not all arrive on the battlefield at the same time, allowing the elite French troops to defeat them one by one. Troops under Overkirk, however, were finally able to chase off the French cavalry. Waldeck, meanwhile, rushed with the infantry to Leuze, but blew off the attack when Luxembourg saw him approaching.

The Allied infantry, including Mackay's Regiment  also took part in the battle but did not see much action.

References

Sources

External links

1691 in France
Battles of the Nine Years' War
Battles involving France
Battles involving England
Battles involving Scotland
Battles involving the Dutch Republic
Battles involving the Spanish Netherlands
Conflicts in 1691
Battle